The seventh season of The Real Housewives of Atlanta, an American reality television series, was broadcast on Bravo. It aired from November 9, 2014, until May 10, 2015, and was primarily filmed in Atlanta, Georgia. Its executive producers are Lauren Eskelin, Lorraine Haughton, Glenda Hersh, Carlos King, Steven Weinstock, and Andy Cohen.

The Real Housewives of Atlanta focuses on the lives of NeNe Leakes, Kandi Burruss, Cynthia Bailey, Phaedra Parks, Kenya Moore and Claudia Jordan. It consisted of twenty-five episodes.

This season marked the final regular appearance of Claudia Jordan.

Production and crew
The Real Housewives of Atlanta was officially renewed for its seventh season on April 8, 2014, while its trailer was released on October 1, 2014. The season premiered on November 9, 2014.

The season premiered with "Bye Bye and Bon Voyage" on November 9, 2014, while the twenty-second episode "Atlanta Twirls On" served as the season finale, and was aired on April 19, 2015. It was followed by a three-part reunion that aired on April 26, May 3, and May 10, 2015, which marked the conclusion of the season.
Lauren Eskelin, Lorraine Haughton, Glenda Hersh, Carlos King, and Steven Weinstock are recognized as the series' executive producers; it is produced and distributed by True Entertainment, an American subsidiary of the Italian corporation Endemol.

A week after the final episode of season 7, May 17, 2015, the fifth spin-off to The Real Housewives of Atlanta premiered on Bravo, titled Kandi's Ski Trip once again starring Kandi Burruss. The three-part television special follows Burruss, her husband Todd Tucker and their blended family as they go to a ski trip together. The series received relatively high ratings.

Cast and synopsis
In June 2014, it was reported that all of the cast members from the previous season would return to the show, including NeNe Leakes, Kandi Burruss, Cynthia Bailey, Phaedra Parks, Kenya Moore, and Porsha Williams. It was later confirmed that radio and television personality Claudia Jordan had officially signed on to be a full-time housewife, while singer-actress Demetria McKinney would have a supporting role. Bravo released the cast photo of the upcoming season a month before its premiere with all the housewives excluding Williams, meaning that she was demoted to a recurring role. The casting decision was met with surprise among the other cast members; Andy Cohen later addressed the decision, explaining that "it was about the amount of story we got from Porsha this season," also adding that they initially wanted her to be a full-time cast member but "haven't gotten enough to merit that."

Reunion Seating Arrangement

 During Williams's appearance at the reunion, Jordan sits next to Bailey on the end of the opposite couch. Williams replaces Jordan in her original seat.

U.S. television ratings 
The season's premiere episode "Bye Bye and Bon Voyage" attracted over 3.8 million viewers during its initial broadcast on November 9, 2014, including 2.2 million viewers in the 18–49 demographic via Nielsen ratings. It marked as the most watched season premiere ever to air on Bravo.

Episodes

References

External links

2014 American television seasons
2015 American television seasons
Atlanta (season 7)